Zeno John Rives (February 22, 1874 – September 2, 1939) was a U.S. Representative from Illinois.

Born near Greenfield, Indiana, Rives moved with his parents to Litchfield, Illinois, in 1880. He attended the public schools. He studied law. He was admitted to the bar in 1901 and commenced practice in Litchfield, Illinois. He was appointed city clerk in June 1903.

Rives was elected as a Republican to the Fifty-ninth Congress (March 4, 1905 – March 3, 1907). He was an unsuccessful candidate for reelection in 1906 to the Sixtieth Congress. He resumed the practice of law in Litchfield, Illinois. He was postmaster of Litchfield 1912-1916. He moved to Decatur, Illinois, in 1919, and engaged in the practice of law and also the real estate business. He died in Decatur, Illinois, September 2, 1939. He was interred in Graceland Cemetery.

References

1874 births
1939 deaths
People from Decatur, Illinois
Republican Party members of the United States House of Representatives from Illinois
Illinois postmasters
People from Litchfield, Illinois
People from Greenfield, Indiana